Chukhonastovka is a rural locality (a selo) and the administrative center of Chukhonastovskoye Rural Settlement, Kamyshinsky District, Volgograd Oblast, Russia. The population was 531 as of 2010. There are 14 streets.

Geography 
Chukhonastovka is located in forest steppe, on the Volga Upland, on the bank of the Balykleyka River, 48 km southwest of Kamyshin (the district's administrative centre) by road. Talovka is the nearest rural locality.

References 

Rural localities in Kamyshinsky District